The General Department of the Central Committee of the Communist Party of the Soviet Union was a department of the Central Committee of the Communist Party of the Soviet Union that oversaw the paperwork of all Central Committee institutions.

Heads
Office of the Presidium
 Nikolai Smirnov (12 September 1920 – 20 August 1922)
 Hamayak Nazaretyan (20 August 1922 – 1 November 1924)
 Lev Mekhlis (1 November 1924 – 22 January 1926)
 Ivan Tovstukha (22 January 1926 – 16 July 1930)
 Alexander Poskrebyshev (16 July 1930 – 15 August 1952)
 Dmitri Sukhanov (15 August 1952 – 20 February 1955)
General Department
 Vladimir Malin (20 February 1955 – 30 August 1965)
 Konstantin Chernenko (30 August 1965 – 12 November 1982)
 Klavdii Bogolyubov (12 November 1982 – 24 May 1985)
 Anatoly Lukyanov (24 May 1985 – 17 January 1987)
 Valery Boldin (17 January 1987 – 3 May 1991)
 Pavel Laptev (3 May 1991 – 29 August 1991)

See also 
General Office of the Communist Party of China

References 

Central Committee of the Communist Party of the Soviet Union
Organizations established in 1920
1920 establishments in Russia